Bathyphytophilus caribaeus is a species of very small, deep water sea snail, a marine gastropod mollusk in the family Bathyphytophilidae, the false limpets.

Distribution
This is a deep-water species occurring in the Caribbean Sea.

Description 
The maximum recorded shell length is 2.8 mm.

Habitat 
Minimum recorded depth is 2450 m. Maximum recorded depth is 6740 m.

References

External links

Bathyphytophilidae
Gastropods described in 1978